Nenad Ćirković (born 9 July 1973 in Arilje) is a former Serbian football player.

References

1973 births
Living people
Serbian footballers
FK Mladost Lučani players
FK Borac Čačak players
FC Elista players
Serbian expatriate footballers
Expatriate footballers in Russia
Russian Premier League players
Association football midfielders